The FIVB World Grand Prix 2007 was the fifteenth edition of the annual women's volleyball tournament, which is the female equivalent of the Men's Volleyball World League.

The 2007 World Grand Prix lasted four weeks with a total number of 65 matches. During the first, second and third week each team played nine  matches in total. Preliminary rounds were staged in Japan (3x), Italy, Poland, Macau, Hong Kong, Russia and Chinese Taipei.

The final round was played in Ningbo, PR China, at Beilun Gymnasium over five days and the best six teams from the preliminary rounds. A round robin system was played to decide the 2007 World Grand Prix Champion.

Qualification

Asia
The top four Asian teams according to the FIVB World Rankings

 Chinese Taipei

Europe
European Qualification Tournament in Varna, Bulgaria, from September 26 to October 1, 2006

Group A

|}

|}

Group B

|}

|}

Play-offs

|}

Third place match

|}

First place match

|}

Russia, Netherlands, Italy and Poland qualified

North and South America
2006 Women's Pan-American Volleyball Cup in San Juan, Puerto Rico from June 27 to July 8, 2006

Teams

Preliminary rounds

Ranking
The host China and top five teams in the preliminary round advance to the Final round.

|}

First round

Group A
Venue: Tokyo, Japan

|}

Group B
Venue: Verona, Italy

|}

Group C
Venue: Rzeszów, Poland

|}

Second round

Group D
Venue: Tokyo, Japan

|}

Group E
Venue: Khabarovsk, Russia

|}

Group F
Venue: Hong Kong

|}

Third round

Group G
Venue: Osaka, Japan

|}

Group H
Venue: Taipei

|}

Group I
Venue: Macau

|}

Final round
Venue: Ningbo, PR China

|}

Final ranking

|}

Overall ranking

Individual awards

Most Valuable Player:

Best Spiker:

Best Blocker:

Best Server:

Best Libero:

Best Setter:

Best Scorer:

References
FIVB
 CEV Results

FIVB World Grand Prix
2007 in Chinese sport
International volleyball competitions hosted by China
2007